Song'z U Can't Find is a compilation of Celly Cel's guest appearance on other rappers albums and compilations. The project was released in 2002 for Boss Up Muzik and was produced by Celly Cel, Studio Ton and G-Man Stan.  This compilation marked the first Celly Cel album not to chart on any album charts.  Guests include E-40, B-Legit, Rappin' 4-Tay, WC, Baby Beesh and C-Bo.

Track listing
"Time 2 Play" – 4:04  
"My Tip Toes" feat. Levitti – 3:59  
"L.A. to the Bay" feat. WC, CJ Mac & Homicide – 4:03  
"What U Hustle Fo?" feat. Baby Beesh & Don Cisco – 4:21  
How I Roll" – 3:45  
"Get They Wig Split" feat. B-Legit & C-Bo – 4:08  
"The Only Way" – 3:58  
"Shoe Strings" feat. E-40, Mugzi & Kaveo – 4:23  
"Pop Yo Collar" feat. Rappin' 4-Tay & Big Ton – 4:17  
"Tramp Delite" – 3:56  
"We Bring the Funk" feat. Mac Shawn – 3:36  
"Beware of Those" feat. E-40 & JT the Bigga Figga – 3:54  
"Struggle" feat. B-Legit & Araphoes – 5:22  
"Bay Riders" feat. William Floyd – 4:14

Celly Cel albums
2002 compilation albums
Gangsta rap compilation albums